Timothy A. Mayer II (born February 19, 1966) is an active motorsports organizer and official, having been SVP of CART / ChampCar; COO of IMSA and the American Le Mans Series; organizer of races worldwide and a steward for the FIA's World Championships, including Formula One.

Early life
The son of American motor racing identity Teddy Mayer and Sarah Mayer (née Bryant, now Dean), Mayer was named after his uncle, racing driver Timmy Mayer.
Mayer was educated at Wellington College in the UK and Lehigh University in Pennsylvania (BS Management).
Mayer enlisted in the US Army from 1986 to 1990, receiving a commission in the Infantry in 1991, before transferring to the US Army Reserve (Civil Affairs).

Motorsport career
Mayer worked with two time World Formula One Champion Emerson Fittipaldi from 1992-1994, and in 1995 established G3 Communications. Between 1995 and 1998, he served as Executive Producer for all Brazilian telecasts of IndyCar, Indy 500 and CART (IndyCar) races. He helped to found, build and operate the Rio de Janeiro Grand Prix (Rio 400). He provided logistics for the Australian Grand Prix and also produced many other international telecasts.

In 1998, Mayer went to work for CART as Senior Vice President of Racing Operations. He subsequently held positions as SVP Promoter Relations, and Special Assistant to the Chairman. He operated CART's worldwide operations, logistics and television - running races across the US, Canada, Mexico, Japan, Australia, the UK and Germany.

In 2003, Mayer left CART to work directly on UK and German races for CART.

In 2004, he was hired as the Chief Operating Officer of International Motor Sports Association (IMSA). In 2006, he also added the title of Chief Operating Officer of the American Le Mans Series (ALMS) and in 2008 added the title of Race Director for ALMS. During Mayer's tenure as COO, IMSA and the American Le Mans Series have risen significantly in prominence, becoming the world's pre-eminent sportscar racing series, and with IMSA re-gaining its role as an eminent sanctioning body.

Mayer left IMSA and the ALMS at the end of 2009, returning to consulting for a variety of companies, through his company G3 Communications. He was elected as an Independent Director of the ACCUS (Automobile Competition Committee of the United States) and is the Alternate Delegate to the FIA. 

Mayer is a FIA International Steward and officiates the World Endurance Championship; the World Touring Car Championship; the World GT1 Championship; and the FIA Formula One World Championship, as well as several junior formulas. Mayer is one of four FIA Chairmen of the Stewards for Formula One.

In 2012 he was also appointed as the General Manager of the Grand Prix of Baltimore.

Mayer has continued to organize and officiate races around the world. Since 2012 Mayer has been President of US Race Management, the subsidiary of the ACCUS responsible for the sporting organization of the FIA World Championship races in the United States, including the WEC, Formula E and all the Formula One races. Mayer is also a partner in AERO Marketing.

Personal life
Mayer was married in 2000 and divorced in 2014. He lives with his two sons Matthew (born 2002) and  Tyler (born 2003) near Atlanta, Georgia. In 2020 Mayer married Katie Kennedy Guest.

References

1966 births
Living people
International Motor Sports Association
Auto racing executives
American motorsport people